Nikolay Grigoryevich Kostylev (4 March 1938 – 7 November 1993) was a Russian weightlifter who won one world and two European titles in 1955–1956. Between 1953 and 1959 he set eight ratified world records: seven in the snatch and one in the total.

References

1938 births
1993 deaths
Soviet male weightlifters
European Weightlifting Championships medalists
World Weightlifting Championships medalists